Cabusao, officially the Municipality of Cabusao, is a 5th class municipality in the province of Camarines Sur, Philippines. According to the 2020 census, it has a population of 19,257 people.

History

Fishing still remains as the major industry in the Cabusao town in the first district of the province. There are attempts, however, to improve the rice production which can only be done if the farmlands can be improved despite the salty soil.

In Barangay San Pedro in this municipality, the Bicol sanitarium can be found where leprous patients are treated and taken care of.

Geography

Barangays
Cabusao is politically subdivided into 9 barangays.
 Barceloneta
 Biong
 Camagong
 Castillo
 New Poblacion
 Pandan
 San Pedro
 Santa Cruz
 Santa Lutgarda

Santa Lutgarda was formerly the Barrio Poblacion; the seat of the municipal government and the town's Catholic church. Through the effort of Mayor Teofilo Santiago, those two major symbol of local power was transferred to the neighboring Barrio Buenavista, presently Barangay New Poblacion. However, the name "Poblacion" is still an integral part of Santa Lutgarda and can be found side by side with the official name (Santa Lutgarda de Bravante).

Climate

Cabusao has varying dry and wet seasons. The dry season begins late March through May and the wet season starts early June through October. The climate and soil are suited for almost all kinds of agricultural crops. Northwest monsoon winds prevail during the months of late October to March. Southwest monsoon starts from June and ends in October.

Demographics

Religion

The municipality is composed of two Catholic parishes, the San Bernardino de Siena Parish and the San Pascual Baylon Parish. Every barangay hold its own barangay fiesta to honor their village patron saint. During that event, the village is lavishly decorated, especially the route of the processions.

The Roman Catholic Church and the local authorities work side by side for a glorious and memorable fiestas. Although there is a separation of church and state, as stated in the country's constitution, the Catholic Church as an institution occupies a very high position in the society.  The present pastoral program is geared toward organizing and strengthening the SKK (saradit na kristiyanong komunidad) which means BEC, basic ecclesial community. Rev. Fr. Apolinar "Yonyon" Rull Napoles Jr.organized the housing projects for the victims of typhoon "Reming" ( International name Durian).  There are two new villages in the place called Dusayan Village (Caritas International) and the San Rafael GK (Gawad Kalinga) Village, both located in the north-east of barangay Castillo.

Among the non-Catholic religions are the Iglesia ni Cristo, Ang Dating Daan, Jesus Miracle Crusade and very small number of mainline Protestants.

The parish of St. Bernardine of Siena was founded in 1914. The Feastday is every 20th day of May.

The following is the list of parish priests:

Economy

Cabusao is basically an agricultural town where most of its constituents are engaged in farming and fishing.

In 1997, agricultural workers reached to about 37.53% while 62.47% were non-agricultural workers.

Crop Production Rice is the major agricultural crop grown in the municipality. Other crops planted in the municipality are coconut, root crops, vegetables and fruit bearing tree. The production pattern is generally two croppings a year in the area served by irrigation

Livestock Production There are various livestock raisers in the municipality located in all barangays. Commercial raisers or cattle have their pastures and grazing grounds maintained. Poultry production is a very profitable business. There are numerous commercial raisers engaged in egg production.

Fisheries and Aquatic Resources The municipality has vast fishing grounds situated at the San Miguel Bay. Bangus fry is abundantly catch during summer and thus constitutes to the revenues of the municipality. Presently, there are a large number of motorized and non-motorized fishing bancas used commonly by the fishermen on their fishing activities. The fishing method/gear used commonly by the fishermen includes hook and line, beach seines, gill nets, scissors nets, multiple hands lines and cabiao.

Education
The municipality has 2 Secondary Public Schools and 8 Public Elementary Schools. Sta Lutgarda High School is located at Barangay New Poblacion and the Barcelonita Fisheries School at Barangay Barcelonita.

References

External links

 [ Philippine Standard Geographic Code]
Official Site of the Province of Camarines Sur
Philippine Census Information

Municipalities of Camarines Sur